Hermann Detering (1953 – October 2018) was a Berlin pastor sceptical of Paul's authorship of the Pauline epistles, in line with radical criticism. He identified Paul with Simon Magus, the Samaritan sorcerer who opposed Peter.

Simon Magus as Paul
Many scholars, since Ferdinand Christian Baur in the 19th Century, have concluded that the attacks on "Simon Magus" in the 4th Century Pseudo-Clementines may be attacks on Paul. Detering takes the attacks of the Pseudo-Clementines as literal and historical, and suggests that the attacks of the Pseudo-Clementines are correct in identifying "Simon Magus" as a proxy for Paul of Tarsus, with Simon-Paul originally having been detested by the church, and the name changed to Paul when he was rehabilitated by virtue of forged Epistles correcting the genuine ones.

Detering's argument expands beyond the Pseudo-Clementines to include other apocrypha, arguing that Simon Magus is sometimes described in apocryphal legends in terms that would fit Paul, though most significantly in the Clementine Recognitions and Homilies. Detering contends that the common source of these documents may be as early as the 1st century in a polemic against Paul, emanating from the Jewish side of Christianity. Having thus identified Paul with Simon, Detering argues that Simon's visit to Rome (in the Pseudo-Clementines) had no other basis than being an account of Paul's presence there, and, further, that the tradition of Peter's residence in Rome rests on the assumed necessity of his resisting the arch-enemy of Judaism there as elsewhere. Thus, according to Detering, the idea of Peter at Rome originated with the Ebionites, but it was afterwards taken up by the Catholic Church, and then Paul was associated with Peter in opposition to Simon, who had originally been himself.

Comments on Islam

On his blog Radikal Kritik, Detering made numerous comments about Muslim immigrants from Syria, largely blaming them for influxes of crime and not assimilating to German culture. These comments have sparked some controversy for Islamaphobia and Xenophobia. In another post, Detering decries the rise of violence from Muslims in Germany, though saying that peaceful Muslims are not the issue, stating that many questions about Islam's acceptance in Germany remained unanswered, such as "Gehört die Aufteilung der Welt in Gläubige und Ungläubige auch zu Deutschland? Was ist mit Dschihad? Was ist mit Polygamie? Was ist mit der Todesstrafe für Apostaten? Was ist mit Körperstrafen für Diebe und Ehebrecher und Alkoholtrinker? Was ist mit Frauenrechten, die im Islam kaum vorhanden sind? Was ist mit Sklaverei, die im Islam nicht verboten ist?"

Works
 ; Published in English: ; English translation revised 2018:  and ASIN B006XXX04G.
 Paulusbriefe ohne Paulus? Die Paulusbriefe in der holländischen Radikalkritik (Kontexte) (German Edition) (9783631447871):
 “The Dutch Radical Approach to the Pauline Epistles,” in Journal of Higher Criticism 3/2 (Fall, 1996)

References

2018 deaths
1953 births
20th-century Protestant theologians
21st-century Protestant theologians